Lido Anthony "Lee" Iacocca (October 15, 1924 – July 2, 2019) was an American automobile executive best known for the development of the Ford Mustang, Continental Mark III, and Ford Pinto cars while at the Ford Motor Company in the 1960s, and for reviving  the Chrysler Corporation as its CEO during the 1980s. He was president and CEO of Chrysler from 1978 and chairman from 1979, until his retirement at the end of 1992. He was one of the few executives to preside over the operations of two of the United States' Big Three automakers.

Iacocca authored or co-authored several books, including Iacocca: An Autobiography (with William Novak), and Where Have All the Leaders Gone?.

Early life
Iacocca was born in Allentown, Pennsylvania, to Nicola Iacocca and Antonietta Perrotta, Italian Americans (from San Marco dei Cavoti, Benevento) who had settled in the steel producing region of Pennsylvania's Lehigh Valley. Members of his family operated a restaurant, Yocco's Hot Dogs, which continues to operate four store locations in Allentown and its suburbs. He was said to have been christened with the unusual name "Lido" because he was conceived during his parents' honeymoon in the Lido district in Venice. However, he denied this rumor in his autobiography, saying that is romantic but not true; his father went to Lido long before his marriage and was traveling with his future wife's brother.

Iacocca graduated with honors from Allen High School in Allentown in 1942. He attended Lehigh University in neighboring Bethlehem, Pennsylvania, where he graduated with a degree in industrial engineering. At Lehigh University, he was a member of Tau Beta Pi, the engineering honor society, and Theta Chi fraternity.

After graduating from Lehigh, he won the Wallace Memorial Fellowship and went to Princeton University, where he earned a master's degree in mechanical engineering in 1946. 

Iacocca then began his career at the Ford Motor Company, working at first as a Ford engineer.

Ford Motor Company (1946 to 1978)

Iacocca joined Ford Motor Company in August 1946.  After a brief stint in engineering, he asked to be moved to sales and marketing, where his career flourished. While working in the Philadelphia district as assistant sales manager, Iacocca gained national recognition with his "56 for '56" campaign, offering loans on 1956 model year cars with a 20% down payment and $56 in monthly payments for three years. His campaign went national, and Iacocca was called to the Dearborn headquarters, where he quickly moved up through the ranks. On November 10, 1960, Iacocca was named vice-president and general manager of the Ford Division; in January 1965 Ford's vice-president, car and truck group; in 1967, executive vice-president; and president on December 10, 1970.

Iacocca participated in the design of several successful Ford automobiles, most notably the Ford Mustang, the Continental Mark III, the Ford Escort and the revival of the Mercury brand in the late 1960s, including the introduction of the Mercury Cougar and Mercury Marquis.  He promoted other ideas that did not reach the marketplace as Ford products. These included cars ultimately introduced by Chrysler – the K car and the minivan. Iacocca also convinced company boss Henry Ford II to return to racing, claiming several wins at the Indianapolis 500, NASCAR and the 24 Hours of Le Mans.

Eventually, he became the president of the Ford Motor Company, but he clashed with Henry Ford II. He was fired on July 13, 1978, even though the company posted a $2 billion profit for the year.

Ford Pinto

In 1968, Iacocca foresaw the need for domestically produced, small, fuel-efficient vehicles, and proposed a vehicle that weighed less than 2,000 pounds and would be priced at less than $2,000. Although Ford's European subsidiary was already selling such a model (the Ford Escort), a team of Ford designers was assigned to create the exterior and interior of an entirely new car, which would be named Pinto. The Pinto entered production beginning with the 1971 model year. Iacocca was described as the "moving force" behind the Ford Pinto.

In 1977, there were allegations that the Pinto's structural design allowed its fuel-tank filler neck to break off and the fuel tank to be punctured in a rear-end collision, resulting in deadly fires. This case is a staple of engineering ethics courses as an example of a bad cost–benefit analysis. In 1978, all 1971–76 Pintos were recalled and had safety shielding and reinforcements installed to protect the fuel tank.

Chrysler (1978 to 1992)
Iacocca was strongly courted by Chrysler at a time when the company appeared to be on the verge of going out of business and had just sold its loss-making Chrysler Europe division to Peugeot in an effort to generate cash because the company was losing millions already in North America. This was partially due to recalls of its Dodge Aspen and Plymouth Volare, both of which, Iacocca later said, were among the causes for Chrysler's woes and customer dissatisfaction.  Iacocca joined Chrysler and began rebuilding the entire company from the ground up and bringing in many former associates from Ford.

Also from Ford, Iacocca brought to Chrysler the "Mini-Max" project, which, in 1983, bore fruit in the highly successful Dodge Caravan and Plymouth Voyager. Henry Ford II had wanted nothing to do with the Mini-Max, a restyled version of the minivan, which Toyota was selling in huge numbers in Asia and Latin America, and his opinion doomed the project at Ford. Hal Sperlich, the driving force behind the Mini-Max at Ford, had been fired a few months before Iacocca.  He had been hired by Chrysler, where the two would make automotive history together.

Iacocca arrived shortly after Chrysler's introduction of the subcompact Dodge Omni and Plymouth Horizon. Bearing a strong resemblance to the Volkswagen Rabbit, the front-wheel-drive Omni and Horizon became instant hits, selling over 300,000 units each in their debut year, showing what was to come for Chrysler. The Omni was a derivative of Chrysler Europe's Chrysler Horizon, one of the first deliberately designed "World Cars", which resulted in the American and European cars looking nearly identical externally. However, underneath remarkably similar-looking sheetmetal, engines, transmissions, suspensions, bumpers, and interior design were quite different.  Initially the U.S. cars even used VW-based engines (while the European models used Simca engines), as American Chrysler did not have an engine of an appropriate size for the Omni until the 2.2L engine from the Chrysler K-Car became available.  Ironically, some later year base model U.S. Omnis used a French Peugeot-based 1.6L engine.

1979 Chrysler bailout

Realizing that the company would go out of business if it did not receive a large infusion of cash, Iacocca approached the United States Congress in 1979 and successfully requested a loan guarantee. To obtain the guarantee, Chrysler was required to reduce costs and abandon some longstanding projects, such as the turbine engine, which had been ready for consumer production in 1979 after nearly 20 years of development.

Chrysler released the first of the K-Car line, the Dodge Aries and Plymouth Reliant, in 1981. Similar to the later minivan, these compact automobiles were based on design proposals that Ford had rejected during Iacocca's (and Sperlich's) tenure. Released in the middle of the major 1980-1982 recession, the small, efficient, and inexpensive front-wheel drive cars sold rapidly. In addition, Iacocca re-introduced the big Imperial as the company's flagship.  The new model had all of the newest technologies of the time, including fully electronic fuel injection and all-digital dashboard.

Chrysler introduced the minivan, chiefly Sperlich's "baby", in late 1983.  It led the automobile industry in sales for 25 years. Because of the K-cars and minivans, along with the reforms Iacocca implemented, the company turned around quickly and was able to repay the government-backed loans seven years earlier than expected.

Iacocca led Chrysler's acquisition of AMC in 1987, which brought the profitable Jeep division under the corporate umbrella. It created the short-lived Eagle division. By this time, AMC had already finished most of the work on the Jeep Grand Cherokee, which Iacocca wanted. The Grand Cherokee would not be released until 1992 for the 1993 model year, the same year that Iacocca retired.

Throughout the 1980s, Iacocca, with the help of his longtime friend and advertisement executive, Leo-Arthur Kelmenson, appeared in a series of commercials developed by Kenyon & Eckhardt for the company's vehicles, employing the ad campaign, "The pride is back," to denote the turnaround of the corporation. He also voiced what was to become his trademark phrase: "If you can find a better car, buy it."

Iacocca retired as president, CEO, and chairman of Chrysler at the end of 1992.

1995 "Return" to Chrysler
In 1995, Iacocca assisted in billionaire Kirk Kerkorian's hostile takeover of Chrysler, which was ultimately unsuccessful. The next year, Kerkorian and Chrysler made a five-year agreement which included a gag order preventing Iacocca from speaking publicly about Chrysler.

In July 2005, Iacocca returned to the airwaves as Chrysler's pitchman, along with celebrities such as Jason Alexander and Snoop Dogg, to promote Chrysler's "Employee Pricing Plus" program; the ads reprise the "If you can find a better car, buy it" line, Iacocca's trademark of the 1980s. In return for his services, Iacocca and DaimlerChrysler agreed that his fees, plus a $1 donation per vehicle sold from July 1 through December 31, 2005, would be given to the Iacocca Foundation for type 1 diabetes research.

Chrysler's 2009 bankruptcy
In an April 2009 Newsweek interview, Iacocca reflected on his time spent at Chrysler and the company's current situation. He said:

Because of the Chrysler bankruptcy, Iacocca lost part of his pension from a supplemental executive retirement plan, and a guaranteed company car during his lifetime. The losses occurred after the bankruptcy court approved the sale of Chrysler to Chrysler Group LLC, with ownership of the new company by the United Auto Workers, the Italian carmaker Fiat and the governments of the United States and Canada.

Other work and activities

Books
 
In 1984, Iacocca co-authored (with William Novak) an autobiography, titled Iacocca: An Autobiography. It was the best selling non-fiction hardback book of 1984 and 1985. The book used heavy discounting which would become a trend among publishers in the 1980s. Iacocca donated the proceeds of the book's sales to type 1 diabetes research.

In 1988, Iacocca co-authored (with Sonny Kleinfeld) Talking Straight, a book meant as a counterbalance to Akio Morita's Made in Japan, a non-fiction book praising Japan's post-war hard-working culture. Talking Straight praised the innovation and creativity of Americans.

On April 17, 2007, Simon & Schuster published Iacocca's book, Where Have All the Leaders Gone?, co-written with Catherine Whitney.

Businesses
Iacocca partnered with producer Pierre Cossette to bring a production of The Will Rogers Follies to Branson, Missouri, in 1994. He also invested in Branson Hills, a 1,400-acre housing development.

In 1993, he had joined the board of MGM Grand, led by his friend Kirk Kerkorian. He started a merchant bank to fund ventures in the gaming industry, which he called "the fastest-growing business in the world". In 1995, he sold his interests in several Indian gaming projects to Full House Resorts, a casino operator led by his friend Allen Paulson, becoming a major shareholder and later a member of the board of directors.

Iacocca founded Olivio Premium Products in 1993. Olivio's signature product was an olive oil-based margarine product. Iacocca appeared in commercials for Olivio.

Iacocca joined the board of restaurant chain Koo Koo Roo in 1995. In 1998, he stepped up to serve as acting chairman of the troubled company, and led it through a merger with Family Restaurants (owner of Chi-Chi's and El Torito). He sat on the board of the merged company until stepping down in 1999.

In 1997, Iacocca founded Iacocca, a company formed to develop and market electric bikes with a top speed of 15 mph and a range of 20 miles between recharging at wall outlets. They produced E-Bike SX, which became the first widely popular electric bicycle in the US. In 1999, Iacocca became the head of EV Global Motors.

Activism and philanthropy
In May 1982, President Ronald Reagan appointed Iacocca to head the Statue of Liberty-Ellis Island Foundation, which was created to raise funds for the restoration of the Statue of Liberty and the renovation of Ellis Island. Iacocca continued to serve on the board of the foundation until his death.

Following the death of Iacocca's wife Mary from type 1 diabetes, he became an active supporter of research for the disease.  He was one of the main patrons of the research of Denise Faustman at Massachusetts General Hospital. In 2000, Iacocca founded Olivio Premium Products, which manufactures the Olivio line of food products made from olive oil. He donated all profits from the company to type 1 diabetes research. In 2004, Iacocca launched Join Lee Now, a national grassroots campaign, to bring Faustman's research to human clinical trials in 2006.

Iacocca was an advocate of "Nourish the Children", an initiative of Nu Skin Enterprises, since its inception in 2002, and served as its chairman. He helped donate a generator for the Malawi VitaMeal plant.

Iacocca led the fundraising campaign to enable Lehigh University to adapt and use vacant buildings formerly owned by Bethlehem Steel, including Iacocca Hall on the Mountaintop Campus of Lehigh University.  Today these structures house the College of Education, the biology and chemical engineering departments, and The Iacocca Institute, which is focused on global competitiveness.

Acting
Iacocca played Park Commissioner Lido in "Sons and Lovers", the 44th episode of Miami Vice, which premiered on May 9, 1986. The name of the character is his birth name, which was not used in the public sphere due to the trouble of mispronunciation or misspelling.

Personal life

Marriages and family
Iacocca was married to Mary McCleary on September 29, 1956. They had two daughters.  Mary Iacocca died from type 1 diabetes on May 15, 1983. Before her death, Iacocca became a strong advocate for better medical treatment of type 1 diabetes patients, who frequently faced debilitating and fatal complications, and he continued this work after her death.

Iacocca's second marriage was to Peggy Johnson.  They married on April 17, 1986, but in 1987, after nineteen months, Iacocca had the marriage annulled. He married for the third time in 1991 to Darrien Earle. They were divorced three years later.

Later life and death
Iacocca resided in the Bel Air section of Los Angeles in his later years. He died at his home on July 2, 2019, at the age of 94. The cause was complications of Parkinson's disease. His funeral was held on July 10, 2019, at St. Hugo of the Hills Roman Catholic Church and he was buried at White Chapel Memorial Cemetery in Troy, Michigan.

Politics

In his 2007 book, Where Have All the Leaders Gone?, Iacocca described how he considered running for president in 1988 and was in the planning stages of a campaign with the slogan "I Like I", before ultimately being talked out of it by his friend Tip O'Neill. Polls at the time confirmed that he had a realistic chance of winning.

Pennsylvania Governor Bob Casey discussed with Iacocca an appointment to the U.S. Senate in 1991 after the death of Senator John Heinz, but Iacocca declined.

Politically, Iacocca supported the Republican candidate George W. Bush in the 2000 presidential election. In the 2004 presidential election, however, he endorsed Bush's opponent, Democrat John Kerry. In Michigan's 2006 gubernatorial race, Iacocca appeared in televised political ads endorsing Republican candidate Dick DeVos, who lost. Iacocca endorsed New Mexico Governor Bill Richardson for President in the 2008 presidential election.  In 2012, he endorsed Mitt Romney for president.

On December 3, 2007, Iacocca launched a website to encourage open dialogue about the challenges of contemporary society. He introduced topics such as health care costs, and the United States' lag in developing alternative energy sources and hybrid vehicles. The site also promotes his book Where Have All the Leaders Gone.  It provides an interactive means for users to rate presidential candidates by the qualities Iacocca believes they should possess: curiosity, creativity, communication, character, courage, conviction, charisma, competence and common sense.

Awards
In 1985, Iacocca received the S. Roger Horchow Award for Greatest Public Service by a Private Citizen, an award given out annually by Jefferson Awards.

Bibliography 

 Iacocca: An Autobiography, Lee Iacocca and William Novak, 1986 
Talking Straight, Lee Iacocca and Sonny Kleinfield, 1988 
Liberty for All, Peter B. Kaplan, Lee Iacocca, Barbara Grazzini, 2002 
Where Have All the Leaders Gone? 2008

In popular culture
The high amount of publicity that Iacocca received during his turnaround of Chrysler made him a celebrity and gave him a lasting impact in popular culture. In addition to his acting role in Miami Vice, Iacocca also made appearances on Good Morning America, Late Night With David Letterman and the 1985 Bob Hope TV special Bob Hope Buys NBC? while concurrently it was common to see depictions of elderly, bespectacled businessmen with charismatic, salesman-like personas, such as in an ad campaign by the Rainier Brewing Company. Iacocca's success serving as Chrysler's pitchman influenced other companies to feature executives in their marketing, such as how fast food chain Wendy's has successfully utilized company founder Dave Thomas as a corporate mascot since the early 1990s. Iacocca's image was also invoked by rival automaker Ford in the marketing campaign for the 1993 Mercury Villager minivan, which depicted a competing car company led by an unhappy boss with a physical resemblance to Iacocca viewing the Villager with consternation because it is outselling their minivan. Fictional businessmen and middle managers, such as Michael Scott on The Office, have been shown reading Iacocca's books and attempting to emulate his methods. In a manner similar to Ronald Reagan, period pieces produced in subsequent decades have used images of Iacocca and the Chrysler K-car to invoke the 1980s. The 2009 film Watchmen, which is set in an alternative history 1985, took this in a unique direction by showing Iacocca (portrayed by Walter Addison) being assassinated by the film's antagonists, which has been said to have angered Iacocca when he learned about it.
In Ordinary People, a song from Neil Young released in Chrome Dreams II and Bluenote Café, Lee Iacocca is quoted in the lyrics as a notable representative of the capitalistic world.

Iacocca, portrayed by Jon Bernthal, is a major character in the 2019 film Ford v Ferrari, which is a dramatization of the 1960s Ford GT40 program. The film was released shortly after Iacocca's death.

Arlo Guthrie and Pete Seeger wrote a song about the bailouts called "I'm Changing My Name to Chrystler," which mentions Iacocca prominently in the chorus. It was critical of the bailout for serving corporate interests ahead of supposed good business or capitalist principles.

See also
 Ford Mustang Iacocca Silver 45th Anniversary Edition
 Ford Carousel garageable van project

References

Bibliography

Works by
 
 Iacocca, Lee and Sonny Klenfield (1988) Talking Straight. Bantam. 
 Iacocca, Lee and William Novak (1986 reissue). Iacocca: An Autobiography. Bantam.

Works about

External links

 Iacocca Foundation
 
 Iacocca Says "Detroit Is Living in the Past", National Public Radio
 Lehigh University Engineering Heritage Initiative Iacocca Biography
 

1924 births
2019 deaths
20th-century American businesspeople
20th-century American writers
21st-century American businesspeople
21st-century American non-fiction writers
American autobiographers
American chief executives in the automobile industry
American philanthropists
American Roman Catholics
American writers of Italian descent
Automotive businesspeople
Businesspeople from Allentown, Pennsylvania
Chrysler executives
Deaths from Parkinson's disease
Ford executives
Ford Mustang
Lehigh University alumni
Male actors from Allentown, Pennsylvania
Neurological disease deaths in California
Pennsylvania Republicans
People from Bel Air, Los Angeles
Princeton University alumni
William Allen High School alumni
Writers from Allentown, Pennsylvania